Trochus Island is an island of the Torres Strait Islands archipelago, located in the Great Barrier Reef Marine Park, east of Cape York Peninsula, in Queensland, Australia.

The island is located in Newcastle Bay at the mouth of Escape River and Middle River, not far from Jackey Jackey Creek and adjacent to the Apudthama National Park.

Gallery

See also

List of Torres Strait Islands

References

Islands on the Great Barrier Reef
Torres Strait Islands
Great Barrier Reef Marine Park
Islands of Far North Queensland